I.O.U. is the second studio album by guitarist Allan Holdsworth, released in 1982 through Luna Crack Records/I.O.U. Records originally on vinyl; a CD edition was reissued in 1985 through Enigma Records, and a remaster in 2008 through Belle Antique. Holdsworth’s band consists of drummer and pianist Gary Husband, bassist Paul Carmichael and singer Paul Williams, with whom Holdsworth had worked in Tempest. A previous solo album, Velvet Darkness, was released in 1976 without Holdsworth's consent, therefore making this (in his view) his first official solo release. Many tracks from Velvet Darkness were refined, re-recorded and retitled for I.O.U., whilst "The Things You see" takes its name from an earlier album of the same name, made in collaboration with keyboardist Gordon Beck.

Critical reception

John W. Patterson at AllMusic described I.O.U. as "high-quality jazz fusion interplay" and praised Holdsworth's "well-crafted soloing".

Track listing

Personnel
Allan Holdsworth – guitar, violin, production
Paul Williams – vocals
Gary Husband – drums, piano
Paul Carmichael – bass

Technical
Andy Llewellyn – engineering
Colin Green – mixing

References

External links
Allan Holdsworth, i.o.u. at therealallanholdsworth.com (archived)

Allan Holdsworth albums
1982 albums
Enigma Records albums